Wooster High School is a public high school in Wooster, Ohio, United States.  It is the only high school in the Wooster City School District.  The mascot/nickname of the school is the Generals, named after American Revolutionary War General David Wooster.

Wooster's football rivalry with the Orrville High School Red Riders is the oldest rivalry in Wayne County, having first met back in 1903. The Generals currently lead the rivalry by a 52-42-9 margin. After the 2014 season, the teams have met 104 times.

State championships

 Boys Golf – 1980
 Speech and Debate- 2001, 2002, 2006, 2015 [5]
 Wheelchair Basketball - 2017, 2018, 2019

Athletics
Wooster High School has 25 athletic teams, of which 12 are for boys, 12 are for girls, and 1 is Co-Ed which compete in the Ohio Cardinal Conference of the Ohio High School Athletic Association. Wooster's teams are dubbed the "Generals".

Boys' Sports
Baseball
Basketball
Bowling
Cross country
Football
Golf
Lacrosse
Soccer
Swimming
Tennis
Track and field
Wrestling
Wheelchair basketball

Girls' Sports
Basketball
Bowling
Cheerleading
Cross country
Gymnastics
Lacrosse
Soccer
Softball
Swimming
Tennis
Track and field
Volleyball
Wheelchair basketball

Awards
Wooster has received recognition for having appeared the most times at national speech and debate tournaments, with sixty-three appearances since the early 1930s. The Wooster High School Speech and Debate team was crowned state champions by the OHSSL in 2001, 2002, 2006 and 2015.

Wooster is the first school district in the state of Ohio to launch an inter-scholastic adaptive sports team for students with physical disabilities. The Wooster Generals wheelchair basketball team competed in Ohio's first interscholastic wheelchair basketball state championship. The team was crowned state champions in 2017, 2018 and 2019 with a combined all-time record of 54–0. Wooster produced the first interscholastic wheelchair basketball player in Ohio to play the sport at the D1 college level.

Notable alumni 

 Bina Venkataraman
 Marquise Blair
 Kaiser Wilhelm (baseball)
 Bob Rhoads
 Charles Follis
 Dick Schafrath
 Vicki Nelson-Dunbar
 Charles S. Schollenberger

References

External links

High schools in Wayne County, Ohio
Public high schools in Ohio